is a Japanese football player. He plays for Mito HollyHock.

Career
Shuhei Takizawa joined J3 League club FC Ryukyu in 2016.

Club statistics
Updated to end of 2018 season.

References

External links
Profile at FC Ryukyu

1993 births
Living people
Toyo University alumni
Association football people from Ibaraki Prefecture
Japanese footballers
J3 League players
FC Ryukyu players
Mito HollyHock players
Association football defenders